Michael Bolochoweckyj (born 4 May 1984) is a Scottish footballer who plays as a defender for Spartans. 

Starting his career with Ross County, Bolochoweckyj also played for Alloa Athletic, Berwick Rangers, East Stirlingshire, Forfar Athletic, Clyde and Montrose.

Career
Though he spent the first eleven months of his career at Ross County, Bolochoweckyj moved to Alloa Athletic in January 2004 after playing just one game for the Staggies. Bolochoweckyj's début for Alloa saw him play 90 minutes against Stenhousemuir, one of four matches he played during January 2004, drafted in to save an injured defence from crumbling. He became a first-team player during the 2005–06 season, in which Alloa finished second bottom and avoided relegation by defeating Berwick Rangers in the Second Division play-off final.

Earlier in the same season, Bolochoweckyj played in four rounds of the 2005-06 Scottish Cup, scoring a goal in the third round clash against Livingston. Alloa were to exit in the next round at the hands of Hamilton Academical, at which point their season would go downhill as they were saved from relegation only at the last minute thanks to a two-legged relegation play-off victory against Berwick Rangers.

Throughout the 2006–07 season, Bolochoweckyj performed consistently in defence, attacking as and when necessary to score three goals, including one on the last day of the season against Forfar Athletic. During a 4–3 away defeat to Ayr United, Bolochoweckyj picked up the first red card of his career.

Bolochoweckyj moved to newly promoted Berwick Rangers at the end of the 2006–07 season. He began his Berwick career with scoring in the Scottish League Cup against Stenhousemuir to help his side to an extra time win. However, his spell at the Borders side was relatively short, and he signed for East Stirlingshire in March 2008. Bolochoweckyj scored his first goal for the Falkirk side just eleven days after signing in a 1–1 home draw with Dumbarton, which ended a run of eleven consecutive defeats for Shire.

He moved to Forfar Athletic for the 2010–11 season. It was announced that he had rejoined East Stirlingshire for the 2013–14 season. At the end of the 2014–15 season, Bolochoweckyj left East Stirlingshire and agreed a one-year deal with Scottish League Two rivals Clyde. He scored on his debut against Livingston in the Scottish Challenge Cup. After one season with Clyde, Bolochoweckyj left Broadwood, signing for Montrose in May 2016. After suffering an ankle injury at the end of the 2016–17 season, Bolochoweckyj moved on loan briefly to former side East Stirlingshire to gain match fitness, before returning to Montrose at the beginning of January 2018. Where upon his return he opened the scoring in a 2 - 0 win over Edinburgh City.

Career statistics

References

External links

1984 births
Scottish footballers
Alloa Athletic F.C. players
Berwick Rangers F.C. players
Ross County F.C. players
East Stirlingshire F.C. players
Scottish Football League players
Living people
Footballers from Edinburgh
Association football defenders
Forfar Athletic F.C. players
Montrose F.C. players
Scottish Professional Football League players
Clyde F.C. players